"Marcia Baïla" is a 1984 song recorded by the French duo Les Rita Mitsouko. It was the third single from their first album, Rita Mitsouko, and was released in April of that year. Dedicated to a dancer with the band who died in 1981, this song was a big hit both in France and abroad and can be considered as being one of the band's signature songs.

Background and writing
The song was composed by both members of the group, Catherine Ringer and Fred Chichin. It is a tribute to Argentine dancer and choreographer Marcia Moretto, who participated in the band's tours before her death from breast cancer in 1983 at the age of 36. With this song, the group enjoyed extensive media coverage; indeed, "the music video for the single [was] a success which result[ed] in repeated and enthusiastic broadcastings on the television, the extravagance of the group express[ing] itself as well in concerts as during its cathodic performances." Philippe Gautier directed the vibrant and widely viewed music video that accompanies the song, and gathered in a global concept representative of the arts of its time, Jean-Paul Gaultier and Thierry Mugler for the costumes and graffiti painters from the Figuration libre movement as well as Xavier Veilhan for the set design. Despite its Spanish title, the lyrics are in French.

Chart performance
In France, the song had a long chart trajectory, remaining on the Top 50 charts for 29 weeks. It debuted at #33 on April 27, 1985, and climbed regularly until it peaked at #2 for three consecutive weeks, but by note and curiosity, it was blocked by the song "Live is Life" by "Opus". In all, it spent 17 weeks in the Top Ten.  The song was Rita Mitsouko's first big hit and propelled them to considerable fame.

In the media and cover versions
The song can be heard in several films, including The Witnesses (produced by André Téchiné, 2007), La Tête de maman (Carine Tardieu, 2007), Le Pornographe (Bertrand Bonello, 2001), Belle Maman (Gabriel Aghion, 1999) and Sans toit ni loi (Agnès Varda, 1985).

The song is also a PAL region exclusive for Just Dance 3.

In 1997, the song was covered in Spanish by Los Del Sol. Gloria Lasso covered the song under the title "Baïlando con Marcia". In 1998, Ricky Martin covered the song on his album Vuelve, on which it features as the 11th track. Christer Björkman also made a version of the song, released as a single in 2002. The French band Nouvelle Vague covered this song for their fourth album Couleurs sur Paris, released in 2010.

Track listings
 7" single
 "Marcia Baïla" — 4:30
 "Jalousie" — 3:40

 12" maxi
 "Marcia Baïla" — 5:34
 "Jalousie" — 3:40
 "Marcia Baïla" (Instrumental) — 6:15

 U.K. 12" single 
 "Marcia Baïla (Extended Version)" — 7:21
 "Marcia Baïla (Extended French Version)" — 5:55
 "Marcia Baïla (7" English Version)" — 4:30

 U.S. Sire Records 12" maxi 
 "Marcia Baïla (English Version)" — 7:21
 "Marcia Baïla (French Version)" — 5:55
 "Jalousie" — 3:40
 "Marcia Baïla (Single Version)" — 4:09
 "Marcia Baïla (Instrumental)" — 6:15

 Canada 12" maxi
 "Marcia Baïla (Extended Version)" — 7:21
 "Andy (7" French Version)" — 4:15
 "Marcia Baïla (Extended French Version)" — 5:10
 "Andy (Extended French Version)" — 5:15

Remixes
Produced by Conny Plank and Les Rita Mitsouko
 Album Version — 5:35
 7" Version — 4:30
 Extended French Version/French Version — 5:55 (remixed by Dominique Blanc-Francard)
 Instrumental — 6:15 (remixed by Dominique Blanc-Francard)
 Re album version (1990) (remixed by Tony Visconti and Les Rita Mitsouko)

Produced by Ivan Ivan
 Extended Version/English Version — 7:21
 7" English Version — 4:30
 Single Version — 4:09

Charts

Certifications

References

External links 
 

1985 singles
Les Rita Mitsouko songs
1984 songs
Virgin Records singles